"Thugs Get Lonely Too" is a song by rapper Tupac Shakur. The song was released as a 12" promo single for his 2004 posthumous album Loyal to the Game. The song was also used as the b-side to the album's lead single Ghetto Gospel. The song features singer Nate Dogg and was produced by Eminem.

It charted at #55 on the Hot R&B/Hip-Hop Songs chart and at #98 on the Billboard Hot 100. As the song was released as a promotional single only, no official music video for the song was created. In 1993, Tech N9ne recorded a verse for the song, while living with QDIII, who at the time was working on Strictly 4 My N.I.G.G.A.Z....

Original Version
The original version of "Thugs Get Lonely Too" was recorded during the Strictly 4 My N.I.G.G.A.Z. & Thug Life era. It was produced by Stretch of the rap group Live Squad and sampled heavily from the song "If I Was Your Girlfriend" by Prince. The title of the song also resembles a track called Gigolos Get Lonely Too by The Time, composed by Prince.

Track listing

Weekly charts

References

Songs released posthumously
Tupac Shakur songs
2004 singles
Nate Dogg songs
Song recordings produced by Eminem
Songs written by Nate Dogg
2004 songs
Songs written by Eminem
Interscope Records singles
Gangsta rap songs